Mohamad Jaamour (born 15 October 1991 in Al Houlah, Homs, Syria) is a Syrian footballer. He currently plays for Al-Karamah, which competes in the Syrian Premier League the top division in Syria. He plays as a midfielder, wearing the number 42 jersey for Al-Karamah.

Club career
Jaamour signed for Al-Karamah as a youth team player on 2010 and rose through the club's youth sides. On 25 January 2011 he made his first competitive appearance for Al-Karamah in a 3–1 victory against Al-Majd in the Syrian Premier League.

Career statistics

Club performance

References

External links
 Mohamad Jaamour at alkarameh.com (Arabic)

1991 births
Living people
Sportspeople from Homs
Syrian footballers
Association football midfielders
Al-Karamah players
Syrian Premier League players